Constantine and the Cross (Italian: Costantino il grande) is a 1961 historical drama film about the early career of the emperor Constantine, who first legalized and then adopted Christianity in the early 4th century. The fictionalised film only stretches as far into his life as the Battle of the Milvian Bridge in AD 312.

It was also known as Constantine the Great or Constantino il Grande - In Hoc Signo Vinces.

Premise
Constantine wins a battle and is sent to Rome. On the way he and his friend Hadrian are attacked by bandits. Hadrian is nursed back to health by some Christians, including Livia, wh falls in love with Hadrian. Constantine discovers the bandits were sent by Maxentius, Constantine's rival for power.

Constantine watches some Christians be eaten by the lions. He jumps into the arena to defend a surviving child, and asks for the other Christians to be set free.

Livia is arrested. Hadrian, who has fallen in love with her, arranges for her to escape from prison. Constantine is blamed, and branded a traitor by the Romans. Constantine leaves his bride to be, Princes Fausta, and learns from his dying father, the Emperor of Gaul, that his mother Helena is a Christian.

Maxentius persecutes Christians and attacks Constantine in Gaul. Constantinus defeats Maxientus and becomes Emperor of Rome alongside Fausta, while Helena blesses them both.

Cast
 Cornel Wilde as Constantine
 Belinda Lee as Fausta
 Massimo Serato as Maxentius
 Christine Kaufmann as Livia
 Fausto Tozzi as Hadrian
 Tino Carraro as Maximian
 Carlo Ninchi as Constantius Chlorus
 Vittorio Sanipoli as  Apuleius 
 Nando Gazzolo as Licinius
  Annibale Ninchi as Galarius 
 Elisa Cegani as Elena 
 Franco Fantasia as Roman Soldier
 Loris Gizzi as  Roman Prosecutor
 Enrico Glori as  Livia's Father
  Jole Mauro as Celi 
 Nando Tamberlani as Diocletian
 Renato Terra as  Jailer  
 Lauro Gazzolo as Amodius

Production
Filming took place in August 1960, with locations in Yugoslavia and studio work in Rome. While filming  a scene in Rome Cornel Wilde was scratched by a lion. Filming was completed by November.

Release
Constantine and the Cross was released in Italy in January 1961. It was released in the United States in December 1962.

Reception
The New York Times called it "one of those ponderous costumed tabloids that's trampled history to death and turned what's left of its fragments into boring banalities."

The Monthly Film Bulletin said "the familiar ingredients of this tired spectacle - lions, fair haired Christian girls, torture chambers, battles, assassination attempts, intrigue - fail to arouse any noticeable excitement in the director or the cast."

The movie was one of Belinda Lee's more widely seen European films.

According to Gary Smith, film historian " The film is memorable for its impressive battle scenes (reused in countless peplum films for years to come) and because of the striking presence of Belinda Lee as Constantine’s wife Fausta."

See also
List of historical drama films
List of films set in ancient Rome

References

Sources

External links

 
 
 
 Costantine and the Cross at Variety Distribution
[COSTANTINO IL GRANDE - IN HOC SIGNO VINCES 
Constantine and the Cross at Letterbox DVD

1961 films
1960s biographical films
Italian biographical films
Peplum films
Films set in ancient Rome
Films set in the Roman Empire
Films set in the 4th century
Religious epic films
Biographical films about Roman emperors
Films scored by Mario Nascimbene
Sword and sandal films
1960s Italian-language films
English-language Italian films
1960s Italian films